Bajaj Allianz Life Insurance is the life Insurance provider in India under government regulation. It was founded in 2001. Some of there plans become popular and studied by major institutions

History 
In 2018 they recorded its name in the Guinness Book Of World Records with the Bajaj Allianz Life Plankathon, and some other awards. During COVID-19 crises, the Organisation has around 10,000+ Employees. In 2023, They partnered with Punjab & Sind Bank for distribution  of insurance Products. They have life insurance plan such as Term Plans, Savings Plans, Investment plans, ULIP, Health, Care Plan, Retirement Plans, Child Insurance Plans, Group Insurance Plans, Micro Insurance Plans

Controversy 
In 2013, IRDA Fines 3 Crore to the organisation for violation of various norms, including those related to early dealth claims and group insurance. Later, IRDA again fines 78 Lakh for rejecting 78 dealth claims for no valid reasons They also ordered it to settle within 180 days.

References 

Indian companies established in 2001
Life insurance companies of India
Life Insurance Corporation